A nigun ( meaning "tune" or "melody", plural nigunim) or niggun (plural niggunim) is a form of Jewish religious song or tune sung by groups. It is vocal music, often with repetitive sounds such as "Bim-Bim-Bam", "Lai-Lai-Lai", "Yai-Yai-Yai" or "Ai-Ai-Ai" instead of formal lyrics.  Sometimes, Bible verses or quotes from other classical Jewish texts are sung repetitively to form a nigun. Some nigunim are sung as prayers of lament, while others may be joyous or victorious.

Nigunim are largely improvisations, though they can be based on thematic passages and are stylized in form, reflecting the teachings and charisma of the spiritual leadership of the congregation or its religious movement. Nigunim are especially central to worship in Hasidic Judaism, which evolved its own structured, soulful forms to reflect the mystical joy of intense prayer (devekut).

Hasidic nigunim

A revival of interest in Jewish music was sparked as part of Hasidism. Different Hasidic groups have their own nigunim, often composed by their rebbe or leader. Hasidim gather around holidays to sing in groups. There are also nigunim for individual meditation, called devekus or devekut (connecting with God) nigunim. These are usually much slower than around-the-table nigunim, and are almost always sung without lyrics. The Baal Shem Tov, founder of Hasidism, spoke of devekus nigunim as "songs that transcend syllables and sound." Several tunes attributed to him are still used today.

Some nigunim originate from non-Jewish sources. Hasidic Jews, based on a practice of their founder Rabbi Israel Baal Shem Tov, have adapted anthems and even folk songs, ascribing them a new spiritual dimension. For example, Chabad Hasidim have adopted the French tunes of La Marseillaise and Napoleon's March, as well as Russian or German drinking songs as a part of their liturgy. Many Hasidim believe that these songs, in their secular forms, are in spiritual exile. By adapting them to liturgical forms, they are "raising Holy Sparks" according to the teachings of Rabbi Isaac Luria's system of kabbalah. (The same justification is used for the use of Arab tunes for Sephardic pizmonim.)  The process continues to this day, with new nigunim emerging from time to time.

Nigunim are usually sung at Hasidic gatherings (Tish/Farbrengens) when large numbers of followers come together to sing and to discuss spiritual concepts. The belief is that when you sing a nigun, the soul of the rabbi who created it appears in the room. On festive occasions the nigunim, especially, are joyful melodies. On the festival of Simchat Torah, the most joyous day in the calendar, fervent nigunim are sung in the dancing with the Torah scrolls in the synagogue.

Amongst the variety of Hasidic dynasties, different styles of nigunim are prominent, reflecting the alternative spiritual paths of each group. These include the emotional creativity of Breslov, the encouraging marches of Ger, the charismatic faith of Kaliv, and the intellectual content of Chabad.

Kaliver nigunim

The Kaliver Dynasty began with Rabbi Yitzchak Isaac Taub (1744–1828) of Nagykálló (in Yiddish Kaliv), Hungary. He was the first Hasidic Rebbe in Hungary. He was discovered by Rabbi Leib Sarah's, a disciple of the Baal Shem Tov. Rabbi Leib first met Rabbi Isaac when he was a small child, a small shepherd boy. Rabbi Leib told his mother, a widow, that her son was destined to be a great Tzadik. He took the small child to Nikolsburg to learn with Rabbi Shmelke of Nikolsburg. Rabbi Isaac grew to be a great Rebbe and was known as "the Sweet Singer of Israel". He composed many popular Hasidic melodies. Often he adapted Hungarian folk songs, adding Jewish words. He taught that the tunes he heard were really from the Holy Temple in Jerusalem, and were lost among the nations over the years, and he found them and returned them to the Jewish people. He said that the proof that it was true was that the gentile who would teach him the song would forget it as soon as the rebbe learned it. He was famous for composing the traditional Hungarian Hasidic tune Szól a kakas már. When Leib Sarah's found him, he sang in Hungarian a song he knew from the shepherds, Erdő, erdő, which he adapted to Judaism by changing the words. In Yitzack Isaac's version, the love in the song is for the Shechina (Divine Presence) that is in exile until the Messiah:

Forest, O forest, how vast are you!
Rose, O rose, how distant you are!
Were the forest not so vast,
My rose wouldn't be so far.
Who will guide me out of the forest,
And unite me with my rose?
Then he sang it as Rabbi Leib Sarah's heard it.

Exile, O exile, how vast are you!
Shechinah, Shechinah, how distant you are!
Were the exile not so vast,
The Shechinah wouldn't be so far.
Who will guide me out of the exile,
And unite me with the Shechinah?

Another famous song by the Kaliver Rebbe is Sírnak, rínak a bárányok – also in Hungarian.

Then there is the beautiful song, Kol Haberuim by Baruch Levine, whose lyrics go:

There's a chamber that doesn't open,
but with a nigun...

Chabad nigunim

Nigunim of the Chabad dynasty are admired across Hasidism for their intellectual depth. The aim of Chabad Hasidic thought is to articulate Hasidic philosophy in philosophical investigation, in order to awaken inner emotional ecstasy. Chabad writings talk of two types of Hasid, the practical "Oveid" (from the word to serve God-Avodah), and the intellectual "Maskil" (from the word to intellectually study-Haskalah). Both are united in the mystical dveikut fervour of Hasidism, but the primary aim of the Oveid is to bring their inspiration into practical action, while the primary aim of the Maskil is to reach deeper understanding of Hasidic thought. This differentiation enables the intellectual aims of Chabad to be holistically united with emotional joy and soul-searching. The second Rebbe of Chabad, Dovber Schneuri, distinguished between mainstream Hasidic "enthusiasm", and the Chabad aim of intellectually created "ecstasy". Enthusiasm expresses itself in emotional exuberance, reflected in emotional nigunim. Ecstasy is an inner emotional perception, and may be restrained in outward expression when suited. The meditative nature of many Chabad nigunim expresses this. Among them:

Niggun Shamil
Niggun of Four Stanzas
Tzomah Lecha Nafshi
Hachanah Niggun
Anim Zemirot
Stav Ya Pitu
Hu Elokeinu

Musar Movement Nigunim 
The Musar movement has also made use of nigunim, based on the realization of how music affects the inner life. In the 19th century, the Musar movement developed its own distinctive nigun chanting traditions. In the 21st century, nigunim may be used at the start and the end of musar study sessions and may help to create an emotional musar experience.

See also
Nigunim:
 Nachman of Breslov
 The Kaliver Rebbe
 Rebbe Moshe Zvi Giterman

Practices:
 Jewish meditation
 Dveikut

Citations

General and cited references 
 Pinson, DovBer, Inner Rhythms: The Kabbalah of Music, Jason Aronson, Inc.  2000. Excellent chapters on the history of Jewish music, the various types and uses of Hasidic nigunim, etc.
 Stern, Shmuel, Shirat HaLev (Trans The Song of the Heart) Translated by Gita Levi.

External links
 CMusic - Lyrics & Reviews for Chasidus Music
 Spiritual Jewish music in Bandcamp 
 Kabbalah of Music
 Shamil Nigun
 Napoleon's March
 Music in Kabbalah
 Biala Nigunim
 Modzitzer Nigunim
 The Nigun from an Ethnomusicological Perspective
 Listen to hundreds of Chabad Nigunim online
 Nigun, about Jewish music chabad.org
 Neohasid - Chasidus without borders
 Power of the Nigun 
 Music of Baruch Levine

Hasidic Judaism
Hebrew words and phrases
Jewish music genres
Jewish music
Jewish prayer and ritual texts
Musar movement